J-Top is a greatest hits album by Taiwanese singer Jolin Tsai. It was released on May 5, 2006, by Sony BMG. It contains 20 songs and four music videos previously released by Sony, one documentary film, one remixed medley, and two previously unreleased songs. It sold more than 100,000 copies in Taiwan, becoming the year's fifth highest-selling album overall in the country.

Background and release 
On July 23, 2002, Tsai signed a recording contract with Sony, through which she later released three studio albums—Magic (2003), Castle (2004), and J-Game (2005), the three albums have sold more than 1.5 million, 1.5 million, and 1.2 million copies in Asia, respectively. In Taiwan, the three albums have sold more than 360,000, 300,000, and 260,000 copies, respectively, and each of them became the highest-selling album by a female artist and the second highest-selling album overall in their respective years of release.

On February 16, 2006, Tsai signed a recording contract with EMI. On April 21, 2006, Sony BMG opened pre-order for Tsai's greatest hits album, J-Top. On April 26, 2006, the label released the music video of "My Choice", which was directed by Chin Cho. On May 5, 2006, the label released the album, J-Top, which includes 20 songs and four music videos previously released by Sony, one documentary film, one remixed medley, and two previously unreleased songs—"My Choice" and "Clothing Astrology". On May 27, 2006, the label released the music video of "Clothing Astrology", which was directed by Bill Chia.

The album topped the album sales charts of G-Music and Five Music in its first week of release. On December 13, 2006, it was reported that the album sold more than 100,000 copies in Taiwan, becoming the year's fifth highest-selling album in the country. On January 12, 2007, it reached number 14 on the 2006 year-end album sales chart of Five Music.

Writing and recording 
“My Choice" evolves from the piano sound in the beginning to the powerful string melody in the chorus, which set off the deep feelings in Tsai's singing, her voice in the beginning shows her delicate and emotional singing skills, the lyrics also describe a state of mind in which breaking up was not "my choice" after love is gone. "Clothing Astrology" is a dance song that incorporated hip-hop, and the strong sense of rhythm with her sexy voice charm make people follow the music to move their body.

Critical reception 
Tencent Entertainment's Shuwa commented, "This Sony-released greatest hits album was released a week earlier than Jolin Tsai's new album Dancing Diva released by EMI. Jolin Tsai faced the competition between her two albums for the second time. There is no hype or nothing to be hyped, just at that time, as long as they were Jolin Tsai's albums, they would become the collections of music fans. In terms of the whole album, two new songs, 20 hits released during the Sony period, and the out-of-print J1 Concert video clip were attractive. It was technically the first greatest hits album that a label did for Jolin Tsai that was available for pre-order, and it became the best-selling greatest hits album that Jolin Tsai released by Sony."

Sina Music's Stephen Lee commented: "In fact, this album includes all of her hits released during the Sony BMG period, it was quite attractive, for example," Say Love You ", "Magic", "Sky", "Overlooking Purposely", "Pirates", and "J-Game", no matter in Hong Kong or Taiwan, a lot of people sang karaoke of such songs, it was also her representative work at Sony. If you want to look back on her development during this period, these songs are indispensable. As for the two new songs, "My Choice" and "Clothing Astrology" are only of average quality. The former's lyrics are smooth and lyrical in style, while the music arrangement is listenable, but it also brings out a sad atmosphere, compared with "Sky", "Rewind", and her other works, it doesn't stand out and is just a smooth ballad. As for another song "Clothing Astrology", its lyrics and melody are average, the whole song seems to have no spirit, even her singing is not good, or it's better to listen to her old songs."

Track listing

Release history

References 

2006 greatest hits albums
Jolin Tsai compilation albums
Sony Music Taiwan compilation albums